Bojan Ljubevski (born 30 November 1996) is a Macedonian handball player who plays for RK Metalurg II.

References

1996 births
Living people
Macedonian male handball players
Sportspeople from Skopje